Jonathan Yong Kim (born 5 February 1984), also called Jonny Kim, is an American U.S. Navy lieutenant commander (former SEAL), physician, and NASA astronaut.

Born and raised in California, Kim enlisted in the U.S. Navy in the early 2000s before earning a Silver Star and his commission.  While a U.S. sailor, Kim also received his Bachelor of Arts in mathematics with distinction, his Doctor of Medicine, and an acceptance to NASA Astronaut Group 22 in 2017.  He completed his astronaut training in 2020 and was awaiting a flight assignment with the Artemis program .

Personal life and education
Jonathan Yong Kim was born on 5 February 1984 in Los Angeles, California.  His parents emigrated from South Korea to the United States in the early 1980s, and his father had scarcely completed a high-school education.  The family opened a liquor store in South Los Angeles, and his mother worked as a substitute elementary school teacher while raising Kim and his younger brother.  In a 2018 interview with Annals of Emergency Medicine, Kim described himself as "the epitome of that quiet kid who just lacked complete self-confidence."  In 2020, The Chosun Ilbo reported that the adolescent Kim had been the victim of domestic violence at the hands of his father; in February 2002, after threatening his family with a gun, Kim's father was shot to death in his attic by police.

At Santa Monica High School, Kim received high grades in his classes, including several Advanced Placements, while participating in swimming and water polo; he graduated in 2002.  Kim received a Bachelor of Arts, summa cum laude, in mathematics from the University of San Diego in 2012, and a Doctor of Medicine from Harvard Medical School in 2016.  Kim was a Pat Tillman Foundation "Tillman Scholar" selectee.  In 2017, Kim completed his medical internship in emergency medicine at Massachusetts General Hospital and Brigham and Women's Hospital.

, Kim was married with three children.

Career

U.S. Navy
Kim learned about and decided to become a Navy SEAL at age 16, investing his remaining high-school years physically conditioning himself for the rigors of Special Warfare training.  Of this decision, Kim said, "Going into the Navy was the best decision I ever made in my life because it completely transformed that scared boy who didn't have any dreams to someone who started to believe in himself."

After enlisting with the United States Navy in 2002 as a seaman recruit, Kim graduated BUD/S class 247 and was assigned to SEAL Team 3 with the rating Special Warfare Operator.  He deployed twice to the Middle East and participated in over 100 combat missions as a combat medic, sniper, navigator, and point man.  During his tenure with the SEALs, Kim served with PO2s Marc Alan Lee and Michael A. Monsoor.  In 2009, Kim was accepted to the STA-21 commissioning program; when he graduated from the University of San Diego in 2012 and left the Naval Reserve Officers Training Corps, Kim entered the Medical Corps.

On 6 June 2022, Kim completed his first solo flight in a Beechcraft T-6 Texan II at the Naval Air Training Command, part of a common training regimen for U.S. NavyNASA astronauts who lacked previous military pilot experience.

Kim is a recipient of a Silver Star, Bronze Star Medal (with Combat "V"), the Navy and Marine Corps Commendation Medal (with Combat "V"), and Combat Action Ribbon.  According to Jocko Willink, Kim's Silver Star was awarded for rescuing multiple wounded Iraqi soldiers in the face of enemy fire.  , Kim was still described as a SEAL with the rank of lieutenant commander.

NASA

While studying at Harvard Medical School, Kim met and was inspired by astronaut–physician Scott E. Parazynski to apply for Astronaut Candidacy.  On June 7, 2017, Kim was one of twelve candidates chosen from a pool of over 18,300 applicants to join NASA Astronaut Group 22.  He reported for duty on 21 August 2017, and graduated from training on 10 January 2020.

According to NASA, Kim will work in the Astronaut Office while awaiting a flight assignment.  On 9 December 2020, NASA formally announced that Kim would join 17 other astronauts in training for a 2024 Moon landing.  In April 2021, he was selected as Increment Lead for Expedition 65.

References

Further reading

External links
 
 

1984 births
21st-century American naval officers
American astronauts
American military personnel of Korean descent
American military snipers
American people of South Korean descent
combat medics
Harvard Medical School alumni
living people
military personnel from California
people from Los Angeles
physicians of Massachusetts General Hospital
recipients of the Silver Star

United States Navy sailors
United States Navy SEALs personnel
University of San Diego alumni